National Route 101 is a national road in the NW of Misiones Province, Argentina ending at Iguazu National Park. It runs for  near the border between Argentina and Brazil crossing the  Missiones Province Departments of General Manuel Belgrano and Iguazú.

After decades of difficult travel through this road, especially after rains, it was decided to pave it starting from the south end. The work was contracted with a financial agreement with the federal government and under the technical supervision and administration of the Dirección Provincial de Vialidad (Provincial Dept. of Transportation).

In 2006 the Dirección Provincial de Vialidad paved the section between Bernardo de Irigoyen and San Antonio. The next  until the rural area known as Piñalito Norte were completed in mid-2007. The section between Piñalito Norte and Provincial Route 19 is under construction. The following  until Puerto Iguazú International Airport is unpaved, while the section from the airport to the junction with National Route 12 is paved.

References

National roads in Misiones Province
Tourism in Argentina